Nécy is a commune in the Orne department in north-western France.

References

Communes of Orne